Kampinos  is a village in Warsaw West County, Masovian Voivodeship, in east-central Poland. It is the seat of the gmina (administrative district) called Gmina Kampinos.

The village lies on the southern edge of the Kampinos Forest, which is protected as a national park (Kampinos National Park) and has been designated a biosphere reserve by UNESCO.

References

External links
 Jewish Community in Kampinos on Virtual Shtetl

Villages in Warsaw West County
Warsaw Governorate
Warsaw Voivodeship (1919–1939)